Stillwater is a village in the northern end of Auckland in the North Island of New Zealand.  Situated on the Weiti River immediately south of the Whangaparaoa Peninsula in the Rodney District, it is part of the area known as the Hibiscus Coast. There is also a Stillwater, West Coast in the South Island.

History

In the early 19th century Silverdale was established as a port for transporting kauri logs to Auckland. Stillwater was also used as a secondary landing to transport logs, kauri gum and later fruit produce from orchards established on cleared land at Stillwater, Silverdale and Dairy Flat. As there was no roading sea was the only form of transport available. The last shipment of kauri gum to leave Stillwater was in 1890. The pack horse tracks from Dairy Flat are still clearly visible on the Weiti Station property.

The first settler in Stillwater in 1852 was Andrew Weatherspoon Thorburn and his family. Part of his original holding is now a reserve and memorial park bequeathed on their farm. Several houses were built on the river's edge in the early days as more land was cleared and made available for farming. Some live stock was introduced, but fruit from orchards seemed to be the major produce transported to Auckland from Stillwater. 

Other early settlers included the Dacres, Percy, Blackshaw and McPike brothers families. In 1950 the McPike brothers subdivided their farm to form what has become the Stillwater settlement known today. After the Second World War the motor camp was developed and a road from East Coast Road constructed. Prior to this there existed only a farm track to Stillwater with a ford crossing at Doctor's Creek. The original bridge built was gradually improved over the years to the two lane concrete bridge today. In 1980 the Council began tar-sealing the road. In 1985 Stillwater was connected to the Whangaparaoa sewerage system and more substantial houses were built in the area. By the year 2000, most of the power and telephone cables were put underground and footpaths formed the length of Stillwater Crescent. Houses were built on almost all the original sections developed and Stillwater could no longer be called a holiday resort; it had become a well established marine suburb. 

In time Coastal Heights was developed followed by the adjoining Inlet Views property and new coastal development is taking place over the river opposite the Stillwater Boat Club. Buildings continue to appear as land is cleared.

Demographics
The settlement is part of the larger Silverdale South statistical area.

Stillwater had a population of 975 at the 2018 New Zealand census, an increase of 108 people (12.5%) since the 2013 census, and an increase of 159 people (19.5%) since the 2006 census. There were 345 households, comprising 513 males and 465 females, giving a sex ratio of 1.1 males per female, with 201 people (20.6%) aged under 15 years, 147 (15.1%) aged 15 to 29, 528 (54.2%) aged 30 to 64, and 96 (9.8%) aged 65 or older.

Ethnicities were 93.5% European/Pākehā, 8.3% Māori, 0.3% Pacific peoples, 4.6% Asian, and 1.2% other ethnicities. People may identify with more than one ethnicity.

Although some people chose not to answer the census's question about religious affiliation, 65.2% had no religion, 25.5% were Christian, 0.3% had Māori religious beliefs, 0.3% were Muslim and 2.2% had other religions.

Of those at least 15 years old, 168 (21.7%) people had a bachelor's or higher degree, and 78 (10.1%) people had no formal qualifications. 195 people (25.2%) earned over $70,000 compared to 17.2% nationally. The employment status of those at least 15 was that 492 (63.6%) people were employed full-time, 120 (15.5%) were part-time, and 12 (1.6%) were unemployed.

References

External links
 Photographs of Stillwater held in Auckland Libraries' heritage collections. 

Populated places in the Auckland Region
Hibiscus Coast